The Minister of State for Science, Research and Innovation (also known as Science Minister) is a mid-level position in the Department for Science, Innovation and Technology in the British government. It was re-created by the Second Johnson ministry out of the Minister of State for Universities.

From 2016 to 2023, the minister worked at the Department for Business, Energy and Industrial Strategy.

Responsibilities 
The minister has responsibility of the following policy areas:

 Science and Research
 Innovation
 Intellectual property
 Space
 Agri-Tech
 Technology

List of ministers

See also 
 Department for Science, Innovation and Technology
Ministry of Science

References

Ministerial offices in the United Kingdom
Lists of government ministers of the United Kingdom
Science ministers
Science and technology in the United Kingdom
Research in the United Kingdom
Business in the United Kingdom
2020 establishments in the United Kingdom